Lonesome Suzie is a 1968 song by The Band written and sung by Richard Manuel originally appearing on their influential debut album Music From Big Pink It was also released on Across The Great Divide, a compilation box set from 1994. Drummer Levon Helm has said that "...Lonesome Suzie was Richard's failed attempt to write a hit record." It never charted and is one of the few songs on which Manuel contributed writing, but is also recognized as one of Manuel's signature pieces.  In 1970 it was released as the B-side of the French single release of "Whispering Pines".

Recording 
The song features Manuel's soulful vocals complemented by Robbie Robertson's simple guitar licks with a subtle backing by the other members. Some of Robertson's guitar licks follow Manuel's lines in a manner similar to Charlie McCoy's work on Bob Dylan's "Desolation Row".

Theme 
The song follows a seemingly troubled woman who hopes to acquire a friend or lover but struggles in doing so. The narrator offers his support, but is not a suitable match. He says he doesn't belong there, but may know someone who does. The narrator, of course, means himself the entire time eventually asking the woman to be with him in the line "why don't we get together, what else can we do?".

Alternate Version 
The 2000 re-issue of Music From Big Pink includes a version of the song with a faster tempo and more doo wop rhythm.

Cover versions 
In 1970, it was covered by Blood, Sweat & Tears on their third album Blood, Sweat & Tears 3.

Personnel 
Richard Manuel - lead vocal, piano
Robbie Robertson - electric guitar
Garth Hudson - Lowrey organ, soprano saxophone
Levon Helm - drums
Rick Danko - bass guitar

References

External links 
 "Lonesome Suzie", complete song lyrics

The Band songs
Song recordings produced by John Simon (record producer)
Songs written by Richard Manuel
1968 songs
1970 singles